Old Shirt to New Jacket (Spanish: De camisa vieja a chaqueta nueva) is a 1982 Spanish comedy film directed by Rafael Gil and starring José Luis López Vázquez, Manolo Codeso and .

Cast

References

External links

Films directed by Rafael Gil
1980s Spanish-language films
1982 comedy films
1982 films
Spanish comedy films
1980s Spanish films